Inman USD 448 is a public unified school district headquartered in Inman, Kansas, United States.  The district includes the communities of Inman, Groveland, and nearby rural areas.

Schools
The school district operates the following schools:
 Inman Jr./Sr. High School
 Inman Elementary School

See also
 List of high schools in Kansas
 List of unified school districts in Kansas
 Kansas State Department of Education
 Kansas State High School Activities Association

References

External links
 

School districts in Kansas
Education in McPherson County, Kansas